The Women's freestyle 68 kg wrestling competitions at the 2022 Commonwealth Games in Birmingham, England took place on 5 August at the Coventry Arena. A total of nine competitors from nine nations took part.

Results
The draw is as follows:

Repechage

References

External link
 Results
 

Wrestling at the 2022 Commonwealth Games
2022 in women's sport wrestling